Zeya (12 June 1916 – 7 October 1996) was a Burmese Academy Award winning film actor and director. He was also a famous body builder.

Biography
Zeya was born Hla Maung  in Nyaunggon village in Upper Burma during the British colonial rule. The 8th of 10 siblings, Zeya left school only third grade to help out with his parents' plantation. He married Than Tin, the daughter of a Mandalay jewellery merchant. They would have nine children.

Zeya became a professional body builder. At age 27, Zeya won the Zeyar Maung (Mr. Zeyar) title in 1943 given by Sagaing Body Building Association. In 1946, he won Shwe Man Maung (Mr. Golden Mandalay).

Zeya made film debut in 1946. In 1956, he won the Burmese Academy Award in Bawa Thanthaya (Life's Samsara). He founded Zeyar Shwe Pyi Film Company and directed several films.

Filmography
 Ma Chit Le Poun Chit Le Poun
 The Saung Hayman
 Oh Meinma
 Bawa Thanthayar
 Pha Ta Lone Gaung Kyar
 Chit Khwint Ma Paing

1996 deaths
1916 births
20th-century Burmese male actors
People from Sagaing Region
Burmese film directors
Burmese male film actors